Pokémon Sage is an upcoming role-playing video game developed by members of the 4chan board /vp/. Sage is a fangame in the Pokémon game series with an entirely new region, plot, and cast of human characters and Pokémon creatures.

Gameplay

Pokémon Sages gameplay is standard for the Pokémon series. However, it includes an entirely new Pokédex. The Starter Pokémon are the avian Grass-type Foliat, the goat-like Fire-type Kidling, and the reptilian Water-type Aguade.

Setting and plot
Pokémon Sage takes place in a fictional region called Urobos. Urobos is loosely based on Central and South America, with many Pokémon, though not all, being related to the real-life region. It features a lush jungle to the south-west, snowy mountains to the north-west, and a huge inescapable desert to the south.
The villainous team(s) in the game are in no way related to the Aztec Empire or the Spanish conquistadors. The town the player starts in is covered in snow since the town is located up in the mountains. The player, named either Simon or Sofia by default, has a friendly rival as well as a more acerbic rival who steals the friendly rival's starter Pokémon.

Development
The game's development began in 2012, when a group of Pokémon fans from /vp/, a board on the website 4chan dedicated to Pokémon discussion, decided to collaborate on a fangame. Developed for computers running Microsoft Windows, it was created using the software RPG Maker with the aid of Pokémon Essentials, a set of scripts tailored to Pokémon gameplay. The development team has sought out help from outside sources, allowing submissions for concept art and in-game sprites. The working title was CAPX, which remains the namesake of the game's wiki. The game's development has been lengthy and marked by internal disagreements; by June 2014, even the villainous team had not yet been chosen from a list of candidates. A demo was released in 2014; it lasts for around two hours of gameplay and includes three towns and two caves, with a limited Pokédex of ten Pokémon.

See also

Katawa Shoujo, another game developed on 4chan

References

Aztecs in fiction
Freeware games
Role-playing video games
Upcoming video games
Vaporware video games
Video games featuring protagonists of selectable gender
Windows games
RPG Maker games
Fangames
Unauthorized video games
Pokémon